Octopussy is a 1983 role-playing game adventure for James Bond 007 published by Victory Games.

Plot summary
Player characters search for the murderer of a "00" agent and the victim's possible connection to a Faberge Egg.

Reception
Nick Davison reviewed Octopussy for Imagine magazine and stated that "A bit more expensive than the average scenario, this one does contain more than some. Octopussy should be enjoyed by those who enjoy some character interaction rather than just gunning them down."

Steve Crow reviewed Octopussy in Space Gamer No. 71. Crow commented that "Overall, Octopussy is an excellent buy, a must for any James Bond 007 gamemaster.  It could easily be converted to another gaming system, so it is worth purchasing by anyone interesting in secret-agent RPGs."

Reviews
Different Worlds #39 (May/June, 1985)

References

James Bond 007 (role-playing game) adventures
Role-playing game supplements introduced in 1983